Kareelakulangara is a small junction situated in Pathiyoor village of Alappuzha district of Kerala state of India. National Highway NH47 passes through this junction. Alappuzha district co-operative spinning mills LTD is situated in Kareelakulangara.

References

Villages in Alappuzha district